Joseph Andrew Petree III (born August 15, 1958), is a former NASCAR crew chief, driver, team owner, and broadcaster who has worked as the rules analyst for Fox NASCAR and the Vice President of Competition at Richard Childress Racing.  After racing for years at local short tracks (most notably Hickory Motor Speedway), Petree became part owner of the No. 32 Busch Series car for Dale Jarrett. By the age of 28, Petree was already a Winston Cup Series crew chief on the Leo Jackson racing team. That car was driven by the Bandit Harry Gant. Petree was a color commentator for ESPN and ABC's NASCAR coverage.

Championship years
In 1993, Petree was hired by Richard Childress Racing, ending up as crew chief for the No. 3 Chevrolet Monte Carlo driven by Dale Earnhardt. Earnhardt won his sixth and seventh championships (1993 and 1994) with Petree. However, at the conclusion of the 1995 season, Petree left RCR and bought Leo Jackson's No. 33 team.

Car owner
Petree took over the No. 33 Chevrolet in late 1996, finishing out the year with driver Todd Bodine, and the team had its first full season under Petree's leadership in 1997. The rebranded Andy Petree Racing brought on veteran driver Ken Schrader, who drove the car to 2 top-5s and 8 top-10s en route to 10th place in the 1997 Winston Cup final standings. Schrader also won 2 poles in his inaugural season with the team. It marked a strong comeback for the No. 33 team, which had struggled severely in 1996, as driver Robert Pressley left the no. 33 car soon after Petree acquired the team.

In 1998, Schrader received 3 top-5s and 11 top-10s. However, he fell two positions down the points ladder to 12th. Despite not receiving an invitation to the New York awards ceremony, Petree was ambitious. At Daytona in October, Petree fielded a second car, the No. 55 Chevrolet, driven by Hut Stricklin. At the end of 1998, it was announced that Kenny Wallace would join APR (Andy Petree Racing) in the No. 55 Square D Chevy for 1999.

1999 was a learning year for APR. The struggles of adding a second car may have shown. Schrader struggled with only 6 top-10s, en route to a 15th place in points. Wallace was more flashy but also inconsistent. He earned his career best finish of 2nd at New Hampshire International Speedway, and had 4 other top-10s, but Kenny would finish 22nd in points.

Schrader's 1999 season compelled him to leave APR. However, Petree was quick in signing Joe Nemechek and sponsor Oakwood Homes, after Skoal announced it would not be on the No. 33 for the first time in 21 years. The 2000 season was complete opposite for Petree's drivers. Nemechek was solid as he won 1 pole, and secured 3 top-5s and 9 top-10s. That enabled him to finish 15th in points. Kenny, on the other hand had one top-5: 2nd at Talladega Superspeedway. It was a memorable one though. Wallace stayed behind Dale Earnhardt in a two-lap dash and his help allowed Earnhardt to win his 76th and final NASCAR race. Wallace admitted later that he would have pulled out had he realized that Nemechek was behind him (Nemechek would finish 3rd). Nemechek had been running a Charlie Daniels paint scheme and Wallace did not recognize it. Despite getting as close as anyone to Petree's first victory, Wallace left for Eel River Racing.

Still searching for victory in 2001, Petree kept Nemechek in the No. 33 and hired Bobby Hamilton to drive the No. 55. A 3rd team with Geoff Bodine driving made one start in 2000, but the deal fell through. It would turn out to be Petree's best season yet. The 9th race of the year, at Talladega Superspeedway, featured an amazing battle. After multiple lead changes, Hamilton took the lead as he took the white flag and held off Tony Stewart to win Petree's first career race. Hamilton would earn 6 more top-10s and 18th in the final 2001 rundown. For Nemechek, the season was mixed. While practicing at Dover Downs, Nemechek slammed the wall, and injured his leg. Luckily, Hamilton's son, Bobby Hamilton Jr. was more than willing to join his father. Hamilton Jr. ran 3 races, Wally Dallenbach Jr. ran at Pocono, and Scott Pruett took over at Sears Point. When Nemechek came back, his season was not the best and before October was over he announced his plans to leave. But Nemechek had one more trick up the sleeve. Nemechek pulled a dominating victory at North Carolina Speedway, giving APR its 2nd win from its 2nd team. However, with Nemechek gone and Oakwood leaving, the No. 33 began to fold.

For 2002, Petree still wished to run the No. 33 along with Hamilton. Mike Wallace would drive the car for 4 races. However, with a best finish of 21st (Daytona 500) and its most memorable moment being at Talladega, (starting the big wreck) the No. 33 team's glory days were over. It would be up to Hamilton and the No. 55 team. However, just as the No. 33 quit for good, Hamilton was injured. Greg Biffle and Ron Hornaday took over. Hamilton came back and promptly announced he was leaving to his truck team.

Petree was backed in a corner. By February 2003, his Cup team was done. With no sponsor to be found, Christian Fittipaldi's run in the No. 33 Monaco Chevy in the Daytona 500 appeared to be the final race.

However, Petree wasn't quite done. His longtime friend, John Menard convinced him to look at John's son, Paul Menard, who impressed Petree He signed him to a contract quickly. Paul made his debut in the No. 55 Chevrolet at Nashville Superspeedway, Petree's first career Busch race as an owner. It was a productive race, as Paul finished 12th. After finishing 14th at the next race at Kentucky Speedway, Petree allowed Menard to make his Cup debut at Watkins Glen International (after Paul had DNQd at Infineon). That race at the Glen would be Petree's last Cup race. The next week, Paul grabbed his first top-10 at IRP. Petree, who had made some Craftsman Truck Series starts, decided to put Paul in some Truck races. Menard drove the No. 33 Menards truck in 5 races and finished with one top-10, an 8th place at Kansas.

Petree signed Menard to a full Busch Series schedule for 2004, hoping to get Menard ready for a return to Nextel Cup in 2006. However, Menard had other plans. Halfway through the year, Menard signed with Dale Earnhardt, Inc., leaving Petree without at driver and a sponsor. His last Busch race would be at Chicago, which driver Clint Bowyer drove.

Petree's race team was dead in the water. After Michael Waltrip finished last at a Craftsman Truck race at IRP, Petree sold his equipment and his shop to Kevin Harvick (which started Kevin Harvick, Inc.). He went to work for Michael Waltrip, as a consultant for Waltrip's Busch team.

Car driver
In 1988, Petree joined the G & G Racing team for 4 races. He finished 36th, 17th, 22nd and 30th, with the best finish at Martinsville Speedway. Martinsville was also his best qualifying effort of the season. There he started 18th.

While working for Dale Earnhardt, Earnhardt allowed Petree to drive his Busch car at Martinsville (1994). After starting 27th, Petree bettered his career best with a 16th. It would be his final Busch Series start.

While his Cup team was falling apart, Petree tried to get some momentum going in the Craftsman Truck Series. Petree made his debut in that series at Martinsville in 2002. Despite an impressive 3rd place qualifying effort, Petree crashed and finished in 31st. However, the race at IRP later that year was better. He finished 12th.

In 2003, Petree made 4 Truck starts and finished in the top-20 in each. He was 14th at Mesa Marin, 10th at Martinsville (career best), 20th at IRP, and 18th at the second Martinsville race.

Petree's final start of his NASCAR career came at his best track: Martinsville in 2004. He started that race 9th and finished a respectable 18th.

Seven months later, his team was sold and Petree's career as a car owner and a car driver was finished.

Broadcasting career
On October 12, 2006, Petree was officially named a color commentator of the ESPN/ABC NASCAR broadcast team for their Nationwide and Cup Series coverage. Petree joined Rusty Wallace and Jerry Punch in the broadcast booth, with Jamie Little, Mike Massaro, Dave Burns, Vince Welch, and Allen Bestwick reporting from pit road.  By 2011, Petree was the only member of the 2007 broadcast team still in the booth; until ESPN's final season of broadcasting NASCAR, he was joined by Bestwick and Dale Jarrett, with Wallace in the infield studio and Punch on pit road.

On February 10, 2015, Petree was hired by Fox NASCAR as a rules analyst. However, Petree didn't return to FOX for 2016.

Motorsports career results

NASCAR
(key) (Bold – Pole position awarded by qualifying time. Italics – Pole position earned by points standings or practice time. * – Most laps led.)

Busch Series

Craftsman Truck Series

References

External links
 
 
 
Andy Petree's ESPN Bio
Andy Petree NASCAR.com Bio

Living people
1958 births
People from Hickory, North Carolina
Motorsport announcers
NASCAR crew chiefs
NASCAR team owners
Racing drivers from North Carolina
NASCAR drivers
ARCA Menards Series drivers
American television sports announcers
Dale Earnhardt Inc. drivers